The Piedmontese regional election of 1970 took place on 7–8 June 1970.

Events
Christian Democracy was by far the largest party and, after the election, it formed a government along with the Italian Socialist Party, the Unitary Socialist Party and the Italian Republican Party (organic Centre-left). The regional government was led by Edoardo Calleri di Sala until 1973 and then by Gianni Oberto Tarena, both Christian Democrats.

Results

Source: Ministry of the Interior

Elections in Piedmont
1970 elections in Italy